Earl of Durham is a title in the Peerage of the United Kingdom. It was created in 1833 for the Whig politician and colonial official John Lambton, 1st Baron Durham. Known as "Radical Jack", he played a leading role in the passing of the Great Reform Act of 1832. As Governor General of British North America he was the author of the famous Report on the Affairs of British North America, known in Canada as the Durham Report. Lambton had already been created Baron Durham, of the City of Durham and of Lambton Castle in the County Palatine of Durham, in 1828, and was created Viscount Lambton at the same time as he was raised to the earldom. These titles are also in the Peerage of the United Kingdom.

He was succeeded by his eldest surviving son, the second Earl. He served as Lord-Lieutenant of County Durham from 1854 to 1879. On his death the titles passed to his eldest twin son, the third Earl. He was Lord-Lieutenant of County Durham from 1884 to 1928 and was made a Knight of the Garter in 1909. He died childless and was succeeded by his younger twin brother, the fourth Earl. He represented South Durham and South East Durham in the House of Commons. His grandson, the sixth Earl, was a Conservative politician. He disclaimed his peerages shortly after succeeding his father in 1970, but continued improperly to style himself Viscount Lambton. As of 2014 the titles are held by his only son, the seventh Earl, who succeeded in 2006. Before succeeding in the earldom he styled himself Lord Durham to avoid confusion with his father.

Several other members of the Lambton family have also gained distinction. Both the first Earl's father, William Henry Lambton (1764–1797), and grandfather, Major-General John Lambton (1710–1794), as well as his great-uncle Henry Lambton (1697–1761), represented the City of Durham in Parliament. The Hon. Sir Hedworth Lambton (1856–1929) (who assumed the surname of Meux in lieu of Lambton), third son of the second Earl, was an Admiral of the Fleet. The Hon. Charles Lambton (1857–1949), fourth son of the second Earl, was a Brigadier-General in the Army. The Hon. George Lambton (1860–1945), fifth son of the second Earl, was a thoroughbred racehorse trainer who trained two Epsom Derby winners. The Hon. Sir William Lambton (1863–1936), sixth son of the second Earl, was a Major-General in the Army.

The ancestral seats of the Lambton family are Lambton Castle, near Chester-le-Street, County Durham, and Fenton, near Wooler, Northumberland.

The first Lord Durham was the inventor of Dominion Status throughout the British Empire, leading to the creation of the  Commonwealth of Nations. Canada's Official Name was the 'Dominion of Canada' though it is now simply Canada. The Regional Municipality of Durham and Lambton County, both in the Province of Ontario, are named after Lord Durham.

Earls of Durham (1833)
 John George Lambton, 1st Earl of Durham (1792–1840)
 George Frederick d'Arcy Lambton, 2nd Earl of Durham (1828–1879); only son surviving to adulthood of the 1st Earl.
 John George Lambton, 3rd Earl of Durham (1855–1928); eldest son of the 2nd Earl, died without legitimate male issue.
 Frederick William Lambton, 4th Earl of Durham (1855-1929); second son of the 2nd Earl and younger twin brother of the 3rd Earl.
 John Frederick Lambton, 5th Earl of Durham (1884–1970); eldest son of the 4th Earl.
 Roderick Lambton, Viscount Lambton (1920–1941); died without issue
 Antony Claud Frederick Lambton, 6th Earl of Durham (1922–2006) (disclaimed 1970); 2nd son of the 5th Earl
 Edward Richard Lambton, 7th Earl of Durham (b. 1961); only son of the 6th Earl.

The heir apparent is the present holder's eldest son Frederick Lambton, Viscount Lambton (b. 1985).

Notes

References

Kidd, Charles, Williamson, David (editors). Debrett's Peerage and Baronetage (1990 edition). New York: St Martin's Press, 1990, 

Heritage of World Civilizations Eighth Edition p762 Craig, Albert M.; Grahm, William A.; Kagan, Donald; Ozment, Steven M.; Turner, Frank M. 2009

Earldoms in the Peerage of the United Kingdom
Noble titles created in 1833
Noble titles created for UK MPs